Burnett Creek is a rural locality in the Scenic Rim Region, Queensland, Australia. It borders New South Wales to the south.

Geography
The locality takes its name from the watercourse Burnett Creek which rises in the south of the locality and flows toward the north-east corner of the locality when it flows into Lake Maroon, the reservoir created by the Maroon Dam, and beyond, eventually becoming a tributary of the Logan River in Rathdowney.

The terrain is mountainous with the following named peaks:
  Bald Knob 
  Big Lonely Peak 
  Double Peak 
  Durramlee Peak 
  Focal Peak 
  Minnages Mount 
  Montserrat Lookout 
  Mount Ballow 
  Mount Clunie 
  Mount Philip 
  Mowburra Peak 
  Nothofagus Mountain 
  Stags Head 
Much of the south of the locality is within the Mount Barney National Park which extends into neighbouring Mount Barney and Maroon.

History
Burnett Creek Provisional School opened on 13 May 1902. On 1 January 1909 it became Burnett Creek State School. It closed on 29 July 1921 due to low student numbers. The school was at 1418 Burnett Creek Road.

The locality contained 12 households, in which 75.0% of the population were males and 25.0% of the population were females with a median age of 55, 17 years above the national average. The average weekly household income was $687, $731 below the national average.

Education 
There are no schools in Burnett Creek. The nearest government primary school is Maroon State School in neighbouring Maroon to the north-east. The nearest government secondary school in Boonah State High School in Boonah to the north.

References 

Scenic Rim Region
Localities in Queensland